California Proposition 1 may refer to:

 1998 California Proposition 1, concerning property tax valuation
 1998 California Proposition 1A, concerning bonds related to education
 2004 California Proposition 1A, concerning revenue collected by local government
 2006 California Propositions 1A–E, concerning taxes and bonds for several programs
 2008 California Proposition 1A, concerning high-speed rail
 2009 California Propositions 1A–F, concerning several reforms to state law
 2014 California Proposition 1, concerning bonds to upgrade California's water system
 2018 California Proposition 1, concerning veterans' home loans and affordable housing
 2022 California Proposition 1, concerning abortion and contraception